Johannes Bauer is the name of:
 Johannes M. Bauer, American professor
 Johannes Bauer (musician) (1954–2016), German trombonist